William Raymond "Chip" Healy Jr. (August 16, 1947 – October 8, 2019) was a professional American football player, who played linebacker for the St. Louis Cardinals.

After retiring from football in 1970, Healy moved around Tennessee working for his father's brokerage business, before retiring in 1987. Since 2001, he operated Transitional Living in Nashville, Tennessee, known as "Chip's Place", a treatment and living facility for men struggling with alcoholism, which initially included Healy himself.

A devout Christian, Healy lived in Nashville and had two children. His nephew Will Healy was the head football coach at The University of North Carolina at Charlotte.

Chip Healy died in Nashville on October 8, 2019 at the age of 72.

References

External links 
 Transitional Living website

1947 births
2019 deaths
Alcohol abuse counselors
American football linebackers
Players of American football from Atlanta
St. Louis Cardinals (football) players
Vanderbilt Commodores football players